A by-election was held for the Australian House of Representatives seat of Richmond on 14 September 1957. This was triggered by the sudden death of Country Party MP Larry Anthony.

The by-election was won by Anthony's son Doug, also running for the Country Party, who prevailed over a six-candidate field that included four endorsed Country Party members.

Results

References

1957 elections in Australia
New South Wales federal by-elections